Stacked Up is the debut album by UK rap-rock group Senser.  It was released in the UK on 2 May 1994 and entered the national charts at No.4.

It features an eclectic, incendiary cross over of hip hop, rock and psychedelia.

Background
Senser was formed in the late eighties, originally with Kerstin Haigh on lead vocals and, from 1991, Heitham Al-Sayed as the drummer. Al-Sayed moved onto vocal duties when the band covered Public Enemy's "She Watch Channel Zero?!", from that groups influential It Takes a Nation of Millions to Hold Us Back album.

The band's first two singles, "The Key", released in September 1993, and "Switch", released in March 1994, made the UK Singles Chart Top 50, and garnered rave reviews from both dance and indie reviewers.

The political background in Britain, and the impending passing of the Criminal Justice Act into statute paved the way for a series of politically influenced artists such as The Levellers, The Prodigy, Dreadzone, and Pop Will Eat Itself, and Senser fit into that group with a blend of aggressive hip-hop, thrash metal and psychedelic ambience.

Buoyed by the success of their singles and live performances, Senser released Stacked Up on 2 May 1994.

Track listing
All songs written by Senser unless otherwise indicated
 "States of Mind" – 5:10
 "The Key" – 5:22
 "Switch" – 4:33
 "Age of Panic" – 4:08
 "What's Going On" – 5:07
 "One Touch One Bounce" – 3:24
 "Stubborn" – 5:46
 "Door Game" – 6:39
 "Peanut Head" – 5:40
 "Peace" (Senser, Tim Morton) – 5:50
 "Eject" – 5:19
 "No Comply" – 2:37
 "Worth" – 3:04

Personnel
Alan 'Haggis/Hagos' Haggarty — programming, production, mixing
Heitham Al-Sayed — vocals
 Kerstin Haigh — vocals
 Nick Michaelson — guitar
 James Barrett — bass
 John Morgan — Drums
 Andy "Awe" Clinton — DJ

Singles

Chart performance
Stacked Up was released in the UK on 2 May 1994. In its first week it entered the UK Album Chart at number 4. It gradually dropped down the charts and was last seen at number 64 on 7 September, a total of five weeks altogether.
Stacked Up achieved sales in excess of 400,000 copies.

References

1994 debut albums
Senser albums